Ar-Rastan District is a district of the Homs Governorate in central Syria. The administrative centre is the city of al-Rastan. At the 2004 census, the district had a population of 127,806.

Sub-districts
The district of ar-Rastan is divided into two sub-districts or nawāḥī (population as of 2004):
Al-Rastan Subdistrict (ناحية الرستن): population 64,271.
Talbiseh Subdistrict (ناحية تلبيسة): population 63,784.

References

 
Districts of Homs Governorate